Laura Siegemund was the defending champion, but chose not to participate.

Rebecca Šramková won the title, defeating Martina Trevisan in the final, 6–3, 4–6, 6–1.

Seeds

Main draw

Finals

Top half

Bottom half

References 
 Main draw

Engie Open de Biarritz - Singles